Joseph Paul Hardy (born May 15, 1949) is a former Republican member of the Nevada Senate, representing District 12. Hardy was first elected to the Senate in 2010 when, before redistricting and a change in the nomenclature of the districts, he represented Clark County Number 12. His district represents rural areas of southeast Clark County including the communities of Boulder City, Laughlin, Searchlight, Henderson, Overton, Bunkerville, Mesquite, as well as Nellis Air Force Base, Lake Mead, and Valley of Fire State Park. Hardy previously represented Clark County District 20 from 2002 to 2010.

He served a LDS mission in France. Hardy is currently an Associate Professor and Staff Physician in the Department of Primary Care at Touro University Nevada College of Osteopathic Medicine.

References

External links 
Nevada Legislative Biography
Project Vote Smart profile on Senator Joe Hardy
Follow the Money profile on Senator Joe Hardy

1949 births
20th-century Mormon missionaries
Latter Day Saints from Nevada
Living people
Republican Party members of the Nevada Assembly
Republican Party Nevada state senators
University of Nevada alumni
21st-century American politicians